Neyorlyn Melrose Williams (born 1991) is a Sierra Leonean model and beauty pageant titleholder who was crowned as the winner of the 2010 edition of the Miss Sierra Leone pageant.

Early life and education
Born in Freetown, Sierra Leone; Williams attended St. Joseph's Convent School and later pursued an international diploma in Human Resource Management with  Cambridge University.

Pageantry

Miss Sierra Leone 2010
Whilst representing Western Area Urban District, Williams was crowned winner of the 2010 edition of Miss Sierra Leone that was held on July 30 at the Family Kingdom Entertainment Complex in Freetown. This result qualified her to represent her country at the Miss World 2010 pageant held on 30 October at the Crown of Beauty Theatre in Sanya, China.

Miss World 2010
She represented Sierra Leone at the Miss World 2010 pageant but failed to place.

External links
Neyorlyn Williams on Miss Sierra Leone 2010
 Miss World Official Profile

References

Sierra Leone Creole people
People of Sierra Leone Creole descent
1991 births
Living people
Miss World 2010 delegates
Sierra Leonean beauty pageant winners
People from Freetown